Bodhinyana is a Theravada Buddhist monastery in the Thai Forest Tradition located in Serpentine, about 60 minutes' drive south-east of Perth, Australia.

History
The monastery was built in the 1980s and gained interest from Perth media over time.

Abbot 
The abbot is the Venerable Ajahn Brahmavamso Mahathera, usually known as Ajahn Brahm, born Peter Betts in London, United Kingdom on 7 August 1951.  In the late 1960s he graduated with a degree in theoretical physics from Cambridge University. After graduation he taught at a high school in Devon, United Kingdom 
for one year before travelling to Thailand to become a monk and train with the late Venerable Ajahn Chah Bodhinyana Mahathera. Since becoming abbot, he has had experience in speaking with people from other religious traditions.

Location
The monastery is located near the edge of the Darling Scarp in forest, and has been threatened by fire.

Activities 

Bodhinyana, a branch monastery in the tradition of Ajahn Chah until 2009, was established to provide a training facility for monks and to make possible the traditional reciprocal relationship between monks and laity.  Limited numbers of guests are able to stay at the monastery, to practise meditation and to generally assist. Food is provided by alms-givers and there is no monetary charge.

Bhikkhuni controversy
On 22 October 2009 Brahm facilitated an ordination ceremony for bhikkhunis where four female Buddhists, Venerable Ajahn Vayama, and Venerables Nirodha, Seri and Hasapanna, were ordained into the Western Theravada bhikkhuni sangha.  The question of ordaining female monks is controversial in Buddhism, where sexism is increasingly highlighted in traditional practices.  The ordination ceremony took place at Ajahn Brahm's Bodhinyana Monastery at Serpentine (near Perth, WA), Australia.  For his actions of 22 October 2009, on 1 November 2009, at a meeting of senior members of the Thai monastic sangha, held at Wat Pah Pong, Ubon Ratchathani, Thailand, Brahm was removed from the Ajahn Chah Forest Sangha lineage and is no longer associated with the main monastery in Thailand, Wat Pah Pong, nor with any of the other Western Forest Sangha branch monasteries of the Ajahn Chah tradition.

See also
Thai Forest Tradition
Forest Tradition of Ajahn Chah
Ajahn Chah
Ajahn Sumedho
Abhayagiri Buddhist Monastery
Amaravati Buddhist Monastery
New Norcia

References

Further reading
 MacDonald, Kim (1998) The cockney monk.Feature article on Buddhist monk Brahmavanso (once Peter Betts) and Bodhinyana Monastery in Serpentine. Sunday times (Perth, W.A.), 1 February 1998, Sunday Section, p. 2

External links

Asian-Australian culture in Western Australia
Buddhist temples and monasteries of the Thai Forest Tradition
Buddhism in Australia
Buddhist monasteries in Australia
Religious buildings and structures in Western Australia
Thai-Australian culture